Squadron Commander Edwin Harris Dunning, DSC (17 July 1892 – 7 August 1917), of the British Royal Naval Air Service, was the first pilot to land an aircraft on a moving ship.

Early life
Dunning was born in South Africa on 17 July 1892, the second child of Sir Edwin Harris Dunning of Jacques Hall, Bradfield, Essex.  He was educated at Royal Naval Colleges at Osborne and Dartmouth.

First landing on a moving ship

With the ship steaming at 26 knots into a 21 knot wind, his speed over the deck was a few miles per hour. After flying to the left of the bridge and funnel, he steered his plane to the right until it slid over the deck, before cutting the engine, letting it drop onto the ship's deck.

He was killed five days later, during his third landing attempt of the day, when an updraft caught his port wing, throwing his plane overboard. Knocked unconscious, he drowned in the cockpit.

He is buried at St Lawrence's Church, Bradfield, between his parents. A plaque in the church states: 

In memory of Dunning, the Dunning Cup or Dunning Memorial Cup is given annually to the officer who is considered to have done most to further aviation in connection with the Fleet for the year in question. In the 1950s and 1960s it was awarded to Royal Air Force squadrons which achieve the highest standard on courses at the Joint Anti-Submarine School.

Honours and awards
14 March 1916 – Flight Lieutenant Edwin Harris Dunning, RNAS is awarded the Distinguished Service Cross- "Has performed exceptionally good work as a seaplane flyer, making many long flights both for spotting and photographing."
14 March 1916 – mentioned in despatches for service at Gallipoli.
1 October 1917 – The following Officers and Men have been mentioned in despatches – Sqdrn. Cdr. Edwin Harris Dunning, DSC., RNAS (since killed).

Notes

References

 CWGC entry
 Memorial to Squadron Commander Edwin Harris Dunning DSC in St Lawrence's Church, Bradfield, Essex
 HMS Furious

1892 births
1917 deaths
Aviators killed in aviation accidents or incidents in Scotland
British military personnel killed in World War I
Burials in Essex
Deaths by drowning in the United Kingdom
Recipients of the Distinguished Service Cross (United Kingdom)
Royal Naval Air Service aviators
Royal Navy officers of World War I
Victims of aviation accidents or incidents in 1917
South African military personnel